John Dalton (1766–1844) was a scientist who pioneered modern atomic theory.

John Dalton  may also refer to:

John Dalton (American football) (1889–1919), American football player for Navy
John Dalton (architect) (1927–2007), Australian architect
John Dalton (author), American author
John Dalton (bishop) (c. 1821–1869), Roman Catholic bishop
John Dalton (divine) (1814–1874), Catholic divine and translator from Latin, Spanish, and German
John Dalton (musician) (born 1943), former member of the Kinks
John Dalton (soldier) (died 1981), British Army general and father of Richard Dalton
John Call Dalton (1825–1889), American physiologist
John Howard Dalton (born 1941), US Secretary of the Navy
John M. Dalton (1900–1972), Governor of Missouri
John N. Dalton (1931–1986), Governor of Virginia from 1978 to 1982
John Neale Dalton (1839–1931), Royal chaplain and tutor
John Dalton (MP) (1610–1679), English politician who sat in the House of Commons between 1659 and 1679
John Dalton (hurler) (born 1985), Irish hurler
John Dalton (poet) (1709–1763), English cleric and poet
John Dalton (priest), Anglican priest in Ireland

See also
John D'Alton (1882–1963) Roman Catholic Cardinal and Archbishop of Armagh
John D'Alton (historian) (1792–1867), Irish lawyer and genealogist
John D'Alton (engineer) (1829–1904), Australian engineer
Jon Dalton (born 1974), former Survivor contestant
Jack Dalton (disambiguation)